War Memorial Building or War Memorial Auditorium may refer to:

Adirondack Bank Center at the Utica Memorial Auditorium, New York
Blue Cross Arena, Rochester, New York, also known as War Memorial Auditorium
Buffalo Memorial Auditorium, Buffalo, New York, occasionally given the misnomer "War Memorial Auditorium" (in confusion with Buffalo War Memorial Stadium)
Greensboro Coliseum Complex, Greensboro, North Carolina, also known as War Memorial Auditorium
Onondaga County War Memorial, also known as War Memorial Building or War Memorial Auditorium and now known as Upstate Medical University Arena at Onondaga County War Memorial, Syracuse, New York
San Francisco War Memorial and Performing Arts Center, San Francisco, California
War Memorial Auditorium (Fort Lauderdale, Florida)
War Memorial Auditorium (Nashville, Tennessee), also known as War Memorial Building
War Memorial Building (Baltimore, Maryland), on the War Memorial Plaza
War Memorial Building (Jackson, Mississippi), included on List of Mexican-American War monuments and memorials
War Memorial Building (New Martinsville, West Virginia)
 War Memorial Building, Belfast in Northern Ireland

See also
War Memorial Stadium (disambiguation)